Leonardi is an Italian surname.  Notable people with the surname include.

Achille Leonardi, 19th century Italian artist
Alessandro Leonardi or Lionardi, Italian renaissance poet
Alvaro Leonardi (1895 - 1955), Italian World War I Sottotenente 
Andrea Leonardi, better known as Bratt Sinclaire, Italian musician
Anna Isabella Leonardi (1620-1804), prolific Italian composer
Camillo Leonardi (1451–1550), Italian astronomer and astrologer
Cesare Leonardi (1935–2021), Italian architect
Claudio Leonardi (1926–2010), Italian historian and philologist
Elena Leonardi (born 1995), Italian professional racing cyclist
Elvira Bouyeure (1906 - 1999), notable Italian fashion designer and couturier
Elvira Rodríguez Leonardi, Argentine politician
Ezio Leonardi (born 1929), Italian politician
Francesco Leonardi, Italian food author and chef of Empress Catherine II of Russia
Francesco Leonardi (missionary) (died 1646), Papal missionary who served as an Archbishop of Antivari 
Giovanni Leonardi (1541–1609), Roman Catholic saint
Giulia Leonardi (b. 1987), Italian female former volleyball player
Giuseppe Leonardi (born 1996) is an Italian sprinter
Gustavo Leonardi (1869–1918), Italian entomologist
Juan María Leonardi Villasmil (1947-2014), Italian titular bishop of Lesvi and auxiliary of the Archdiocese of Mérida, Venezuela
Lamberto Leonardi (born 1939), Italian professional football coach 
Leoncillo Leonardi (1915 – 1968), Italian sculptor
Luca Leonardi (b. 1991), Italian freestyle swimmer
Marco Leonardi (1971– ), Italian actor
Marina Leonardi (born 1970), Italian pianist and composer
Matilde Leonardi, Italian neurologist and paediatrician
Mauro Leonardi (born 1959), Italian priest, writer and commentator
Michelangelo Leonardi, a former Italian racing driver
Natascia Cortesi (1971– ), Swiss cross-country skier 
Paul Leonardi, professor of Technology Management 
Pietro Leonardi (b. 1963), Italian businessman, sporting and managing director of Italian association football 
Priamo Leonardi (1888 - 1984), Italian admiral during World War II
Rick Leonardi, American comic book illustrator
Salvator Léonardi (1872 – 1938), Italian mandolin virtuoso, teacher and composer
Sergio Leonardi (1944– ), Italian singer and actor
Silvio Leonardi (1914-1990), Italian politician
Tomás Leonardi (born 1987), Argentine rugby union footballer
Thomas Leonardi (born 1954), American insurance executive and former Connecticut's Insurance Commissioner
Vincenzo Leonardi (ca. 1590 – ca. 1646 Rome), Italian illustrator of natural history
Vittorio Leonardi (1977– ), Italian stand-up comedian and actor

Italian-language surnames
Patronymic surnames
Surnames from given names
Surnames of South Tyrolean origin